Stephensia brunnichella is a moth of the family Elachistidae found in Europe and east into the Palearctic.

Description
The wingspan is 8–9 mm. The head is dark bronzy. Antennae with white subapical band. Forewings are dark bronzyfuscous; a subbasal fascia, another before middle, an erect tornal spot, and a costal spot before apex pale golden-metallic. Hindwings are dark grey. The larva is green-whitish; dorsal line dark green; head and plate of 2 blackish.

Biology

The larvae feed on lesser calamint (Calamintha nepeta), wild basil (Clinopodium vulgare) and Satureja calamintha mining the leaves of their host plant. The mine starts as a long, narrow, full depth gallery running toward the leaf tip and the frass is found in a narrow central line. After reaching the leaf tip, the mine becomes a large, full depth, brown blotch. Here, the frass is deposited in black lumps and the larvae may vacate the mine and start elsewhere. Larvae of the first generation hibernate in the mine. Pupation takes place outside of the mine, in a white spinning, mostly between the leaves of the host plant. The larvae have a greenish body with a black head. They can be found from autumn to April and again in July.

Distribution
It is widespread throughout Europe. In the north, the distribution extends up to southern Sweden and Finland and in the east it ranges as far as Asia Minor and the Crimea.

References

External links
 lepiforum.de

Elachistidae
Leaf miners
Moths described in 1767
Moths of Asia
Moths of Europe
Taxa named by Carl Linnaeus